Layle Lane (November 27, 1893 – February 2, 1976) was an American educator and civil rights activist.

Life
Lane was born in Marietta, Georgia in 1893 to Reverend Calvin Lane and Alice Virginia Clark Lane. She was their fourth child. Her father was a Congregationalist minister and her mother was a teacher. Her family left Georgia after her father was threatened to be lynched. The family resettled in Knoxville, Tennessee, and three years later in Vineland, New Jersey. In Vineland, Lane attended Vineland High School, where she was the first black graduate of the school. Lane never married. In 1976, she died in Cuernavaca, Mexico.

Education
Lane graduated from Howard University in 1916. After being unable to receive a job as a teacher in a New York public school, she returned to school earned a second undergraduate degree at Hunter College. She received her master's degree from Columbia University.

Career and activism
Lane became a high school teacher, teaching social studies in a New York high school. Lane was heavily involved in activism throughout her life, and participated in many protests for African American rights and workers' rights. She became an early  member of the Teachers Union, and later the Teachers Guild. She served on the executive board of the Teacher's Guild.

Lane was elected the first black female American Federation of Teachers vice president. She ran five times as a candidate in the Socialist Party for public office. Three of those times were for Congress. Lane served on the National Committee for Rural Schools. She helped to plan and organize the March on Washington for Jobs and Freedom in 1941. Lane ran a summer camp on her Pennsylvania farm for impoverished black children from the inner-city.

References

External links
 The Layle Lane Papers at the New York Public Library
 A book about Lane, "La citadelle : Layle Lane and social activism in twentieth-century America," on WorldCat
 An article about Lane in a 2000 issue of American Educator

1893 births
1976 deaths
Hunter College alumni
People from Marietta, Georgia
Columbia University alumni
People from Vineland, New Jersey
Vineland High School alumni
Howard University alumni
American Federation of Teachers people
American civil rights activists
American socialists
African-American activists
Activists from Georgia (U.S. state)
Activists from New Jersey
Educators from Georgia (U.S. state)
Educators from New Jersey
20th-century American educators
20th-century American women educators
Women civil rights activists
20th-century African-American women
20th-century African-American educators